Katherine Merrill (1876–1962) was an American artist. Her work is included in the collections of the Smithsonian American Art Museum, the Fine Arts Museums of San Francisco and the Art Institute of Chicago.

References

1876 births
1962 deaths
Artists from Milwaukee
19th-century American women artists
20th-century American women artists